Huang Zhizhong, born 5 March 1969 in Tianjin, China is a Chinese actor.

Background

Huang was a basketball player at a young age. After he retired from basketball team, he worked in Tianjin Textile manufacturing factory as a Machinist fitter. Later， he enter Tianjin Trade union Academy for a short training. In 1991, Huang attended the Central Academy of Drama, where he graduated in 1995. He has since gone on to star in numerous TV dramas and films, he is famous known by most audience since historical TV series The Road We Have Taken 2009.

Filmography

Ming Dynasty in 1566 (2007)
My War (2016)
Our Time Will Come (2017)
The Founding of an Army (2017)
Line Walker 2 (2019)
The Captain (2019) 
The Eight Hundred 八佰 (2019)
Royal Nirvana (2019)
Tianxia Changhe (2022)

References

 

Male actors from Tianjin
Living people
1969 births
Central Academy of Drama alumni
Chinese male stage actors
Chinese male film actors
Chinese male television actors
20th-century Chinese male actors
21st-century Chinese male actors